Sorengo railway station is a railway station in the municipality of Sorengo in the Swiss canton of Ticino. The station is on the metre gauge Lugano–Ponte Tresa railway (FLP), between Lugano and Ponte Tresa.

The station has a single platform, served by trains in both directions.

Services 
 the following services stop at Sorengo:

References

External links 
 
 

Sorengo
Ferrovie Luganesi stations